Tomás Rivera Morales, simply known as "Maso Rivera" (November 13, 1927 – February 4, 2001), was a Puerto Rican musician and a major exponent of Puerto Rico's Jíbaro music. Rivera composed over 1,000 instrumental compositions for the Cuatro, Puerto Rico's national instrument.

Early years
Rivera was born in the barrio Galateo in the town of Toa Alta. His parents were Ramón Rivera Nieves and Secundina Morales Rolón. When he was five years old, under his mother's encouragement, he began to play the cuatro. The cuatro is a Puerto Rican indigenous instrument derivate from the guitar family. It is smaller than the guitar and originally had four strings evolving to its modern version of 5 pairs of strings. Rivera built his first cuatro when he was nine years old. His first teacher was Felipe Morales Rolon, Rivera's uncle and Puerto Rican cuatro player and maker. Even though he did not know how to read music, he was a good listener, and learned how to play whole musical compositions by ear.

While Rivera was in the sixth grade, his family found themselves in a difficult financial situation, and he was forced to leave school. He worked with his father on a farm, and helped his mother in a small family-owned store, where he found the time to play the cuatro. He was often asked by the local neighbors to play his instrument at parties and funerals.

Musical career

When drafted into the United States Army in 1950, Rivera took along his cuatro instrument, with which he entertained the troops overseas during his free time. Upon his honorable discharge from the Army in 1954, Rivera returned to Puerto Rico.

Rivera began to write musical compositions, and his first was titled Sobre mis Colinas. He joined other musicians of typical genres from Puerto Rico, such as Florencio "Ramito" Morales Ramos, Jesús "Chuito de Bayamon" Sanchez Erazo, and Guzmán Rosario. He befriended Abelardo Díaz Alfaro, who played an important role in the development of his musical potential.

Rafael Quiñones Vidal, a pioneer in Puerto Rico's television, became aware of Rivera's musical talent and introduced him to the Puerto Rican public via television and radio. Soon, he was serving as the master of ceremonies of various radio programs such as Maratón, La Infancia and Radio Borinquen.

In the mid-1950s, Rivera went on a musical tour with Ramito and served as a goodwill ambassador of the Jibaro music in New York City, with presentations in such places as the Teatro Puerto Rico. He returned to Puerto Rico and married Carmen Rosado, with whom he had two children, named Carmencita and Edwin Tomás.

Rivera composed more than 1,000 instrumental compositions for the cuatro, including the danzas "A mi Madre" and "Nélida", also the décima Lo que Dios me ha Dado. His musical contributions were primarily in the fields of jibaro music, but he interpreted with equal dexterity most of the other Afro-Caribbean and Latin American genres popular in the last few decades.

Later years
Rivera was very innovative using cuatros of different sizes and shapes called 'tiples'. While he was alive, Puerto Rican Baseball Hall of Famer Roberto Clemente presented him with one of his baseball bats. Upon Clemente's death in a plane crash in 1971, Rivera asked a local instruments luthier to assemble a cuatro out of that same bat, which he called "bate cuatro" (bat cuatro).

Rivera died on February 4, 2001, in San Juan, Puerto Rico. During his lifetime, he had been the subject of numerous tributes. After his death, his hometown of Toa Alta honored his memory by naming a middle school and the Municipal Theater after him, and by commissioning a statue in his likeness.

Musical compositions

Among his many musical compositions were the following:
Maso Rivera vs. Santos Rolón y sus Conjuntos de Cuerdas
Maso Instrumental
Felicitaciones Cantan: Juaniquillo, Paquito, y Luisito con Maso Rivera
Trullando por San Juan con Maso Rivera y Nieves Quintero
Mi Puerto Rico Querido: Maso Rivera y su Conjunto de Cuerdas
Aguinaldos con Sinfonía: Canta el Indio de Bayamón con Maso Rivera
Navidades con Maso Rivera y sus Conjuntos
Maso Rivera Alegres Navidades Borincanas
Maso Rivera: 60 Años de Música y Arte

See also

List of Puerto Ricans

Notes

References

1927 births
2001 deaths
Puerto Rican Army personnel
Puerto Rican composers
Puerto Rican male composers
20th-century Puerto Rican musicians
Puerto Rican-cuatro players
People from Toa Alta, Puerto Rico
United States Army soldiers
Puerto Rican Jibaro music musicians
20th-century American male musicians